Samuel Elijah (born 14 November 1969), popularly known as Samuel "Prophet" Elijah is a retired Nigerian footballer who played as a midfielder. He was a member of the Nigeria U-20 team that competed at the 1989 FIFA World Youth Championship.

Early life and career
Born in Bauchi State Nigeria, Samuel started playing football while in primary school and went on to play for companies like Kaduna Textile Limited and Lead Way Insurance in 1985 during his secondary school days.

In 1989, he was part of the Nigeria U-20 team that placed second at the 1989 FIFA World Youth Championship. He went on to gain his first cap as a senior player in a match against Togo.

After numerous injury problems, Samuel went into coaching course in 2004, and officially started coaching Kwara State All Stars. In 2005, Samuel joined Crown FC Ogbomoso and coached them in 2005 and 2006. After 2006, he went to Lagos and coached the Nigeria Port Authority (NPA) in 2007. That was when he met Clemens Westerhof in Ilorin. When his contract expired, Elijah went back to Ilorin to work with Clemens Westerhof at the Kwara Football Academy.

References

External links
 
 11v11 player profile

1969 births
Living people
Nigerian footballers
Nigeria international footballers
Nigeria under-20 international footballers
Association football midfielders